Valea Cheii may refer to the following places in Romania:

 Valea Cheii, a village in the commune Păușești-Măglași in Vâlcea County
 Valea Cheii (Dâmbovița), tributary of the Dâmbovița in Argeș County
 Pârâul Cheii, tributary of the Pârâul Mic in Brașov County
 Valea Cheii, tributary of the Râul Mare in Brașov County

See also 
 Cheia (disambiguation)
 Râul Cheii (disambiguation)